Jude Broughan (born 1976) is an artist and educator, born in Hamilton, New Zealand and now based in Brooklyn, New York. Broughan creates photo-based assemblages, slicing and stitching together original photographs, fabrics, painted and printed elements, in formal compositions that are abstracted and allegorical. She also creates limited edition prints and artists' books.

Career 
Broughan has had solo exhibitions at venues such as Benrubi Gallery. New York (2021, 2020, 2017), Marisa Newman Projects, New York (2017, 2019), Calder and Lawson Gallery, Hamilton, New Zealand (2015), Dimensions Variable, Miami (2014), and Churner & Churner, New York (2014). Her work has been included in numerous group exhibitions and projects including the Museum of Arts and Design, the MoMA Design Store, New York; Bakehouse Art Complex, Miami; Jarvis Dooney Gallerie, Berlin; Document, Chicago; Sanderson Contemporary Art, Auckland, New Zealand; Magnan Metz, New York; Dorfman Projects, New York; the Essl Museum, Vienna, and 601Artspace, New York.

Broughan holds an M.F.A. from Hunter College, New York, and a B.F.A. from the School of Visual Arts, New York. Her work has been discussed in the Site 95 journal, Kolaj Magazine, Musée Magazine, Domino, Art in America, Blouin Artinfo, Collector Daily, Eye Contact, the Village Voice, and Whitehot Magazine, among others.

Broughan teaches in the Visual Arts Department at the SUNY College at Old Westbury, New York. She has held teaching positions at Hunter College, and Borough of Manhattan Community College, CUNY. She has given artist talks at institutions including Hercules Art Studio Program, Pratt Institute, and School of Visual Arts.

Awards 
Pollock-Krasner Foundation Grant (2015), and a Yaddo Residency (2018).

References

External links 
 

1976 births
Living people
21st-century American women artists
21st-century New Zealand women artists
Hunter College alumni
School of Visual Arts alumni
Artists from Brooklyn
People from Hamilton, New Zealand